Christian Grindheim (born 17 July 1983) is a Norwegian retired professional footballer who last played as a midfielder for Eliteserien club FK Haugesund. Grindheim is known as a hardworking midfielder with tough tackling and powerful shots. He has made over 50 appearances for the Norway national team.

Club career
Grindheim was born in Haugesund and started his career in the local club Haugar, before he joined Haugesund where he made his debut for the first team in Tippeligaen at the age of 17. After Haugesund's relegation from the First Division in 2004, several Tippeligaen clubs were interested in his signature.

Viking, with Roy Hodgson as manager, made an offer for Grindheim, but he chose Vålerenga. At Vålerenga, he played regularly for the team that won the league in 2005.

On 7 January 2008, Grindheim joined Heerenveen. Heerenveen paid Vålerenga a reported transfer fee of €3 million. He played 86 matches for the club winning the 2008–09 Dutch Cup.

On 15 June 2011, Grindheim transferred to FC Copenhagen on a three-year contract, for a reported transfer fee of €750,000.

In February 2013, Grindheim returned to Vålerenga on loan with an option to buy, which Vålerenga took up in July 2013, signing Grindheim to a three-year contract.

International career
Grindheim made his debut for the Norwegian national team, on 17 August 2005 in a friendly match against Switzerland. Grindheim played 45 minutes in a match Norway lost 2–0. He scored his first goal in Egil Olsen first match in his second stint as head coach of Norway, the friendly match against Germany on 11 February 2009, He reached his 50th cap in the friendly match against England.

Career statistics 

Notes

International goals

Source:

Honours
Vålerenga IF
 Norwegian Premier League: 2005

SC Heerenveen
 KNVB Cup: 2008–09

F.C. Copenhagen
 Danish Cup: 2011–12

References

External links

1983 births
Living people
People from Haugesund
Association football midfielders
Norwegian footballers
Norway international footballers
Norway under-21 international footballers
FK Haugesund players
Vålerenga Fotball players
SC Heerenveen players
F.C. Copenhagen players
Eliteserien players
Norwegian First Division players
Eredivisie players
Danish Superliga players
Norwegian expatriate footballers
Expatriate footballers in the Netherlands
Norwegian expatriate sportspeople in the Netherlands
Expatriate men's footballers in Denmark
Norwegian expatriate sportspeople in Denmark
Sportspeople from Rogaland